Avinashi Ganeshamurthi is an Indian politician from Tamil Nadu who is a member of the Dravida Munnetra Kazhagam (DMK). He currently represents Erode in the Lok Sabha. He was previously an MP in the 12th and 13th Lok Sabhas.

References

External links
Official biographical sketch in Parliament of India website

Living people
India MPs 2009–2014
Tamil Nadu politicians
Lok Sabha members from Tamil Nadu
India MPs 1998–1999
National Democratic Alliance candidates in the 2014 Indian general election
Dravida Munnetra Kazhagam politicians
People from Erode district
People from Dindigul district
1947 births
India MPs 2019–present